Israel–Myanmar relations refer to the bilateral relations between Israel and Myanmar. The two nations established diplomatic ties in 1953. Israel has an embassy in Yangon, and Myanmar has an embassy in Tel Aviv. The Jewish state has a longtime friendship with Myanmar, which was among the first countries in Asia to recognize Israel's independence and establish diplomatic ties with the young state. There is much cooperation between the two countries especially in the fields of agriculture and education. Myanmar Joins Singapore  as a one of two Southeast Asian States that do not recognise the State of Palestine.

State visits

Burmese prime minister U Nu was the first foreign leader to visit Israel in 1955. Israel's first prime minister, David Ben-Gurion visited Yangon in 1961.

General Min Aung Hlaing visited Israel in 2015 to strengthen bilateral ties between the two nations.

History
Israel has maintained friendly relations with Myanmar even under the previous military junta regime. However, despite Israel's close ties with the Burmese military junta, Israel has expressed support for pro-democracy activist Aung San Suu Kyi in several occasions.

The new ambassador of Myanmar gave his credentials to president Reuven Rivlin in August 2016. The ambassador's daughter is attending Interdisciplinary Center Herzliya and is the first Burmese student at that campus.

The current Israeli ambassador to Myanmar is Daniel Zonshine. He was interviewed by a local news website in Myanmar in 2016, and described the ties between the state of Israel and Myanmar as "good and friendly, with the potential to be even better and friendlier".

Israel has been a major military supplier to the Myanmar Armed Forces. In September 2017, a petition against Israeli arms sales to Myanmar over human rights violations against the Rohingya minority was brought before the Supreme Court of Israel. The Supreme Court's ruling on the case was subjected to a gag order.

In 2018, there was a deal signed between the two countries in which both of the countries could review each other's history textbooks in order to verify accuracy.

During the 2021 Myanmar coup d'état and subsequent protests, a number of Israeli companies were accused of continuing to help the Myanmar junta to acquire modern weapons that eventually used to suppress protesters, despite Israel has imposed lethal embargo from 2018.

See also 

 List of ambassadors of Israel to Myanmar

References

 

Israel–Myanmar relations
Myanmar
Bilateral relations of Myanmar